KH domain-containing, RNA-binding, signal transduction-associated protein 3 is a protein that in humans is encoded by the KHDRBS3 gene.

Interactions 

KHDRBS3 has been shown to interact with SIAH1.

KHDRBS3 interacts with splicing protein Sam68 and oncogene metadherin in prostate cancer cells.

Clinical significance 
KHDRBS3 (T-STAR) expression has been shown to be increased in prostate cancer tissue compared to the surrounding benign tissue. Expression of KHDRBS3  correlates with mpMRI signal measured through Likert score a system similar to PI-RADS. While still under debate, mpMRI signal correlates with higher Gleason grade and tumour size, in addition to histopathological features associated with clinically aggressive prostate cancer. Expression of KHDRBS3 was increased in the failing human myocardium of heart failure patients, here KHDRBS3 protein interacted with several important mRNAs coding for sarcomere components, such as actin gamma 1 (ACTG1), myosin light chain 2 (MYL2), ryanodine receptor 2 (RYR2), troponin I3 (TNNI3), troponin T2 (TNNT2), tropomyosin 1 (TPM1), tropomyosin 2 (TPM2), and titin (TTN).

In prostate cancer cell lines KHDRBS3 appears to be androgen regulated, with a reduction in mRNA expression occurring following addition of synthetic androgen R1881 to cells.

Function 
KHDRBS3 regulates the alternative mRNA splicing of the sacromere protein titin (TTN), leading to intron retention. Overexpression of KHDRBS3 in induced pluripotent stem cell-derived cardiomyocytes (iPSC-CMs) increased Ca2+ transient amplitude and resulted in an increase of Fmax.

References

Further reading